The 1999 Benson & Hedges Super Cup was the twenty-eighth edition of cricket's Benson & Hedges Cup. The competition was won by Gloucestershire County Cricket Club.

Background
The editor of Wisden, Matthew Engel, suggested in the 1995 edition that to liven up the county scene, the Benson & Hedges Cup be restricted to the top eight teams in the previous year's County Championship . This was partly to avoid the possibility of the division of the Championship into two divisions, while offering an incentive for mid-table counties to play positive cricket at the end of the season.

This also relieved some of the pressure on the cricket schedule in the 1999 season with the World Cup encroaching on the schedule.

The tournament was not a success with low attendances, and from 2000, the County Championship was divided into two divisions, and the Benson & Hedges Cup reverted to its prior format, albeit with non-first class teams excluded.

Matches

Quarter-finals

Semi-finals

Final

See also
Benson & Hedges Cup

1999 in English cricket
Benson & Hedges Cup seasons